Willi Welscher (1 August 1906 – 20 February 1987) was a German hurdler. He competed in the 110 metres hurdles at the 1932 Summer Olympics and the 1936 Summer Olympics.

References

1906 births
1987 deaths
Athletes (track and field) at the 1932 Summer Olympics
Athletes (track and field) at the 1936 Summer Olympics
German male hurdlers
Olympic athletes of Germany
Place of birth missing